Turany  is a town and municipality in Martin District in the Žilina Region of northern Slovakia.

History
In historical records the town was first mentioned in 1341.

Geography
The municipality lies at an altitude of 406 metres and covers an area of 46.747 km2. It has a population of about 4,271 people.

References

External links
http://www.statistics.sk/mosmis/eng/run.html
http://turany.sk/

Villages and municipalities in Martin District